Cameroon competed at the 1984 Summer Olympics in Los Angeles, United States. 46 competitors, 42 men and 2 women, took part in 32 events in 6 sports.

Medalists

Athletics

Men's 400 metres
 Mama Moluh
 Heat — 48.90 (→ did not advance)

Men's Long Jump
 Ernest Tche Noubossie
 Qualification — 6.76m (→ did not advance, 29th place)

Women's 100 metres
 Cécile Ngambi
 First Heat — 11.67s
 Second Heat — 11.82s
 Semi Final — 11.91s (→ did not advance)
 Ruth Enang Mesode
 First Heat — 11.81s
 Second Heat — 12.02s (→ did not advance)

Women's Discus Throw 
 Agathe Ngo Nack 
 Qualification — 38.32m (→ did not advance)

Women's Javelin Throw 
 Agnes Tchuinte 
 Qualification — 55.94m (→ did not advance)

Boxing

Cycling

Five cyclists represented Cameroon in 1984.

Individual road race
 Alain Ayissi — did not finish (→ no ranking) 
 Joseph Kono — did not finish (→ no ranking) 
 Dieudonné Ntep — did not finish (→ no ranking) 
 Thomas Siani — did not finish (→ no ranking)

Team time trial
 Alain Ayissi
 Lucas Feutsa
 Joseph Kono
 Dieudonné Ntep

Football

Men's Team Competition
 Preliminary Round (Group B) 
 Cameroon — Yugoslavia 1-2
 Cameroon — Iraq 1-0  
 Cameroon — Canada 1-3
 Quarterfinals
 Did not advance
Team Roster
 ( 1.) Joseph-Antoine Bell (gk)
 ( 2.) Luc Mbassi
 ( 3.) Isaac Sinkot
 ( 4.) Michel Bilamo
 ( 5.) Elie Onana
 ( 6.) Emmanuel Kundé
 ( 7.) Louis M'fede
 ( 8.) Eugene Ekeke
 ( 9.) Roger Milla
 (10.) Dagobert Dang
 (11.) Charles Toubé
 (12.) Ernest Ebongue
 (13.) Paul Bahoken
 (14.) Theophile Abega
 (15.) François Doumbé Lea 
 (16.) Ibrahim Aoudou
 (17.) Jacques Songo'o (gk)
Head Coach: Kae Rade

Judo

Wrestling

References

External links
Official Olympic Reports
International Olympic Committee results database

Nations at the 1984 Summer Olympics
1984
Olympics